Ludmila Múrias Ferber Lino (8 August 1965 – 26 January 2022) was a Brazilian Christian singer, songwriter, worship pastor and writer.

Life and career 
The singer is the descendant of Russian Jews, Spanish and Portuguese. She became evangelical after her father was cured of cancer. Ferber was married in 1987 to José Antônio Lino and has three daughters Ana Lídia, Vanessa and Daniela.

In 1996, Ferber released her first solo CD entitled Marcas and from this launch her career was consolidated achieving prestige in public Brazilian gospel.

She died on 26 January 2022, at the age of 56.

Discography 
Studio albums
 Marcas (1996)
 O Verdadeiro Amor (1998)
 Deus é Bom Demais (1999)
 O Coração de quem Adora (2000)
 O Segredo de ser Feliz (2002)
 Ouço Deus me Chamar (2003)
 24 Horas por Dia (2005)
 Ainda é Tempo (2006)
 Cantarei para Sempre (2008)
 A Esperança Vive (2009)
 Pra Me Alegrar (2013)
 Um Novo Começo (2019)

Live albums
 Os Sonhos de Deus (2001)
 Unção sem Limites (2002)
 Tempo de Cura (2004)
 Uma História, Uma Estrada, Uma Vida (2004)
 Nunca Pare de Lutar (2005)
 Coragem (2007)
 Pérolas da Adoração (2007)
 O Poder da Aliança (2011)

Compilations
 Melodias Inesquecíveis (2007)
 Canções Inesquecíveis (2010)

Kids
 Meu Amigão do Peito (2005)

Singles
 Um Novo Começo (2019)
 O Caminho do Milagre (2019)

Books 
 Nunca Pare de Lutar (2012)

References

External links
 

1965 births
2022 deaths
20th-century Brazilian women singers
20th-century Brazilian singers
21st-century Brazilian singers
21st-century Brazilian women singers
Brazilian Christian religious leaders
Christian music songwriters
Brazilian people of Portuguese descent
Brazilian people of Russian-Jewish descent
Brazilian people of Spanish descent
Performers of contemporary worship music
Brazilian gospel singers
People from Rio de Janeiro (city)
Converts to Evangelicalism from Judaism
Brazilian evangelicals
Brazilian women singer-songwriters